Charles William Appleton (November 9, 1874 – January 10, 1945), was the vice president of the General Electric Company and was a United States magistrate judge and an Assistant District Attorney in New York City.

Appleton graduated from St. Lawrence University in 1897 where his name now bears the Appleton Arena.

References

1874 births
1945 deaths
American business executives
United States magistrate judges
New York (state) lawyers
Place of birth missing
St. Lawrence University alumni